Rhys Phillips (born 6 May 1988) is a New Zealand cricketer. He plays first-class cricket for Otago. He made his Twenty20 debut for Otago on 1 January 2017 in the 2016–17 Super Smash.

See also
 List of Otago representative cricketers

References

External links
 

1988 births
Living people
New Zealand cricketers
Otago cricketers
Cricketers from Dunedin